Szilárd Tóth (born 17 August 1973) is a Hungarian former competitive ice dancer. With Enikő Berkes, he is the 1993 Golden Spin of Zagreb bronze medalist and 1994 national champion. They represented Hungary at the 1994 Winter Olympics.

Career

Partnership with Berkes 
Tóth began his partnership with Enikő Berkes by 1991. They competed in the final segment at four ISU Championships, placing 15th at the 1992 World Junior Championships in Hull, Quebec, Canada; 20th at the 1993 European Championships in Helsinki, Finland; 24th at the 1994 European Championships in Copenhagen, Denmark; and 23rd at the 1995 European Championships in Dortmund, Germany.

Berkes/Tóth were named in Hungary's team to the 1994 Winter Olympics in Hamar. They finished 20th in Norway.

Partnership with Szíjgyártó 
Ahead of the 1995–1996 season, Tóth teamed up with Bianca Szíjgyártó. The two were coached by Gabriella Remport and Ilona Berecz. In their second season together, they won the Hungarian national title and were assigned to two ISU Championships. At the 1997 European Championships in Paris, they qualified to the free dance and finished 24th overall. They were eliminated after the original dance at the 1997 World Championships in Lausanne, Switzerland.

Post-competitive career 
Tóth has served as an International Skating Union judge for ice dancing.

Programs 
(with Szijgyarto)

Results

With Berkes

With Szíjgyártó

References

Navigation

Hungarian male ice dancers
Olympic figure skaters of Hungary
Figure skaters at the 1994 Winter Olympics
1973 births
Living people
Figure skating judges